Rajambal is a 1951 Indian, Tamil language film directed by R. M. Krishnaswamy. The film stars R. S. Manohar and P. K. Saraswathi.

Plot 
The story is of a judicial officer who misuses his office to achieve his personal needs.

Cast 
List adapted from the film's song book

Male cast
 Manohar as Gopalan
 S. Balachander as Natesan
 K. Sarangapani as Detective Govindan
 B. R. Panthulu as Saminatha Sastri
 M. V. Mani as Lawyer Duraisami Iyengar
 (Friend) Ramasami as Ramanna
 T. N. Sivathanu as Neelamega Sastri
 Stunt Somu as Narasimhalu Naidu
 P. Sundar Rao as Manavala Naidu
 Kulathu Mani as Judge
 V. K. Karthikeyan as Murugan
 T. V. Sethuraman as Muniyan

Female cast
 P. K. Saraswathi as Rajambal
 Madhuri Devi as Lokasundari
 C. R. Rajakumari as Balambal
 T. P. Muthulakshmi as Kanakavalli
 C. K. Saraswathi as Mangalam
 K. S. Angamuthu as Pankajam
 P. S. Gnanam as Pavadai
 K. S. Adilakshmi as Rukmani

Production 
The film was produced by V. C. Subbaraman and M. Radhakrishnan together with R. M. Krishnaswamy who also directed the film and handled the cinematography. C. V. Raju and Paul G. Yadav did the editing. The screenplay was based on a stage play with the same name written by J. R. Rangaraju. Dialogues were penned by A. T. Krishnaswamy. T. V. Sarma was in charge of art direction while the choreography was done by Kumar. Still photography was done by R. N. Nagaraja Rao. The film was processed at Vijaya laboratory.

This film is the debut for R. S. Manohar whose real-life name was R. S. Lakshminarasimhan. He was working in the Postal Department and was acting in stage dramas as an amateur artiste.

This is the second version of the stage play. It was filmed earlier in 1935 with the same title, Rajambal directed by A. Narayanan.

Trivia 
Film historian Randor Guy says when the producer went to renew the certificate, the then Regional Censor Officer G. T. Sastri, who was the toughest ever censor officer, not only refused to renew the certificate but also asked to surrender the negatives of the film as the subject of the story "was illegal, immoral and anti-social!"

Soundtrack 
Music for songs was composed by M. S. Gnanamani while background score was by S. Balachander. The lyrics were penned by A. Maruthakasi and Ku. Sa. Krishnamoorthy. Singers are S. Balachander and K. Sarangapani while the playback singers are A. M. Rajah, V. N. Sundaram, Thiruchi Loganathan, M. L. Vasanthakumari, P. Leela and A. G. Rathnamala.

Reception 
The film fared moderately at the box office and is "Remembered for R. S. Manohar’s film debut, ‘Veena’ Balachandar’s performance and background score and for being the first production of RMK."

References 

Indian films based on plays
Films scored by M. S. Gnanamani
1950s Tamil-language films